The Kindness of Strangers is a 2019 internationally co-produced drama film, written and directed by Lone Scherfig. It stars Zoe Kazan, Tahar Rahim, Esben Smed, Andrea Riseborough, and Caleb Landry Jones.

It had its world premiere at the Berlin International Film Festival on February 7, 2019. It was released in the United States on February 14, 2020, by Vertical Entertainment.

Plot
On the run from an abusive husband, Clara tries to survive on the New York streets with her two children during a harsh winter. She has the help of lonely Alice, doltish Jeff, and the sad chef Marc.

Cast
 Zoe Kazan as Clara Scott
 Tahar Rahim as Marc
 Esben Smed as Richard Scott
 Andrea Riseborough as Alice
 Caleb Landry Jones as Jeff
 Bill Nighy as Timofey
 Jay Baruchel as John 
 Jack Fulton as Anthony Scott
 Finlay Wojtak-Hissong as Jude Scott
 Nicolaj Kopernikus as Sergei Scott
 Rodrigo Fernandez-Stoll as Laundry Worker #1

Production
In February 2017, it was announced Lone Scherfig would direct the film, from a screenplay she wrote, with HanWay Films, Ingenious Media, Apollo Media, Creative Alliance, Strada Films, Telefilm Canada, Danish Film Institute, Nadcon,  D'Artaganan and Entertainment One serving as producers. In February 2018, Andrea Riseborough, Tahar Rahim and Zoe Kazan joined the cast of the film. In March 2018, Bill Nighy, Caleb Landry Jones and Jay Baruchel joined the cast of the film. In September 2018, it was announced the title was The Kindness of Strangers.

Filming
Principal photography began in March 2018, and took place in Toronto, Ontario, Canada, New York City, and Copenhagen, Denmark.

Release
It had its world premiere at the Berlin International Film Festival on February 7, 2019. It was released in the United States on February 14, 2020, by Vertical Entertainment.

Reception
The site's critical consensus reads, "A talented onscreen ensemble is done no favors by The Kindness of Strangers, which searches for meaning and comes up empty." Metacritic reports a score of 32 out of 100 based on 11 critics, indicating "generally unfavorable reviews".

References

External links
 
 The Kindness of Strangers at Library and Archives Canada

2019 films
2019 drama films
American drama films
British drama films
Canadian drama films
English-language Canadian films
French drama films
English-language French films
German drama films
English-language German films
Swedish drama films
English-language Swedish films
Entertainment One films
HanWay Films films
Vertical Entertainment films
Films about domestic violence
Films about homelessness
Films directed by Lone Scherfig
Films scored by Andrew Lockington
British films set in New York City
Films shot in New York City
Films shot in Toronto
2010s English-language films
2010s Canadian films
2010s American films
French films set in New York City
2010s British films
2010s French films
2010s German films
2010s Swedish films